Ernest Collymore (4 February 1893 – 23 June 1962) was a Barbadian cricketer. He played in one first-class match for the Barbados cricket team in 1922/23.

See also
 List of Barbadian representative cricketers

References

External links
 

1893 births
1962 deaths
Barbadian cricketers
Barbados cricketers
People from Saint Michael, Barbados